Bellerive-sur-Allier is a commune in the Allier department in central France.

Known as Vesse or Vaisse, it was renamed Bellerive-sur-Allier in 1903.

Population

Geography

Location 
Bellerive-sur-Allier was member of Gannat district in 1793, which becomes an arrondissement in 1801; member of the arrondissement of Lapalisse from 1926 to 1942 and arrondissement of Vichy since 1942. It was member of the canton of Escurolles from 1801 to 2015. The commune is the centralizer office of the canton of Bellerive-sur-Allier (11 communes) since March 2015.

Transportation

Road transportation 
Bellerive-sur-Allier is at the junction of several main roads, including the main ones:
 the departemental road 2209 (RD 2209);
 the departemental road 984 (RD 984) passing by the town hall;
 the departemental road 6 (RD 6) coming from Saint-Pourçain-sur-Sioule.
These main roads are not enough to relieve congestion at peak hours (quasi-permanent stoppers on deck Bellerive) and the arrival of the A719 motorway in 2015, though it approaches the heart of the town, was not enough to improve the traffic conditions.

The main roads are closed to vehicles weighing more than 7.5 tonnes except for local traffic. Controls are organized regularly by municipal services to ensure that heavy vehicles comply with the regulations.

Parking is free. It performs even side on even years and odd side on odd years.

Cycling transportation 
Bike lanes were built on part of the RD 2209, on the Avenue de Vichy (north-south between the Boussange roundabout and Georges-Beaugnies alley and in both directions beyond) and Avenue de la République in both directions and the roundabout of the Republic since 2010, as well as a portion of the Maurice-Chalus street, a portion of one-way between Jean-Ferlot street and the church (between two traffic calmings).

Bike paths also exist around the bridge of Europe.

In July 2010, a 2.7 km-cycle route was established between the Bellerive bridge and the swimming centre. This service comes despite an impairment of this signaling equipment, better service. New roads have been built and existing roads were adapted.

Round of the Lac d'Allier by bike is completed in July 2011.

Urban transportation 
The city is served by five lines of the bus network MobiVie.

Politics and administration 
The current mayor is François Sennepin, elected in 2020.

Twin towns 
 Hadamar, Germany
 Impruneta, Italy

See also
Communes of the Allier department

References

Communes of Allier
Allier communes articles needing translation from French Wikipedia